Iolaus flavilinea is a butterfly in the family Lycaenidae. It is found in Cameroon and Zambia.

References

Butterflies described in 1928
Iolaus (butterfly)